Vicente de la Fuente García (29 January 1934 – 22 December 2021) was a Spanish politician. A member of the Union of the Democratic Centre, he served as Mayor of Betanzos from 1979 to 1983. He died on 22 December 2021, at the age of 87. He was the first Mayor elected in Betanzos after the fall of Francoist Spain.

Mayorship
As mayor of Betanzos, de la Fuente worked to bring back transparency that was lacking during the Francoist era. This included recovering municipal archival documents and opening a municipal archive. In addition, he revived  after a 30-year pause in publication. The publication, which is a university-level research journal, has since been archived at the Library of Congress.

Personal life
Vincente de la Fuente had 9 children.

Legacy
The mayor of Betanzos at the time of his death, María Barral, has proposed to rename the Santo Domino cultural building to Centro Cultural Vincente de la Fuente.

References

1934 births
2021 deaths
Union of the Democratic Centre (Spain) politicians